Frittoli is an Italian surname. Notable people with the surname include:

 Barbara Frittoli (born 1967), Italian operatic soprano 
 Mario Frittoli (born 1966), Italian chef

See also
 Frìttuli, traditional dish made of pork parts in the city of Reggio Calabria, Italy

Italian-language surnames